"Who Wants to Live Forever" is a song by the British rock band Queen. A power ballad, it is the sixth track on the album A Kind of Magic, which was released in June 1986, and was written by lead guitarist Brian May for the soundtrack to the film Highlander. Queen was backed up by an orchestra, with orchestrations by film score composer Michael Kamen. The song peaked at No. 24 in the UK charts. In 1991, it was included in the band's second compilation album Greatest Hits II.

Since its release, the song has been covered by many artists. Five months after Mercury's death in November 1991, Seal performed a live version of the song at The Freddie Mercury Tribute Concert in 1992. In 2014, Rolling Stone readers voted it their fifth favourite song by Queen, and in 2018 it was listed at number 15 in "The top 20 Queen songs of all time" by Smooth Radio.

Recording
In the 1986 film Highlander, the song is used to frame the scenes in the film where Connor MacLeod must endure his beloved wife Heather MacLeod growing old and dying while he, as an Immortal, remains forever young. Brian May wrote the song in the backseat of his car after seeing a 20-minute first cut of the scene of Heather's death. It was later used in the Highlander television series episodes "The Gathering", "Revenge is Sweet", "The Hunters", "Line of Fire", and "Leader of the Pack".

In the film version, Freddie Mercury provides all the main vocals. On the album version, May sings lead vocals on the first verse before Mercury takes over, with May also singing "But touch my tears with your lips" during Mercury's verse and the closing line "Who waits forever anyway?". An instrumental version of the song, entitled "Forever", was included as a bonus track on the CD version of the album. This instrumental featured only a piano, with keyboard accompaniment during the chorus sections. The piano track was recorded solely by May. Queen were backed up by an orchestra arranged by Michael Kamen.

Music video
The video was directed by David Mallet and filmed in a (now demolished) warehouse at Tobacco Wharf at London's East End on 16 September 1986. It featured the National Philharmonic Orchestra with forty choirboys and several hundreds of candles which remain lit throughout filming as well as Mercury wearing a tuxedo suit. It is also the last time Freddie was depicted with a moustache as the next music video he was in his solo work The Great Pretender he shaved off his moustache and never grew it back. The video also features bass guitarist John Deacon playing a white double bass, despite not performing on the original recording. Roger using an array of percussion while Brian played keyboards then his usual Red Special guitar with the orchestra and at the end.

An alternate version with clips from the film Highlander (which the song appears in) appears on the video single with "A Kind of Magic" in October 1986 and later as a hidden music video on the Queen Greatest Video Hits II DVD in November 2003.

Live performances
The song was performed by Queen during the 1986 Magic Tour. Live, May would begin playing synthesizer (a Yamaha DX7) before moving to guitar halfway through the song.

Track listing 
7-inch single

A Side. "Who Wants To Live Forever" (Single Version) - 4:01

B Side. "Killer Queen" - 2:59

12-inch single

A1. "Who Wants To Live Forever" (Single Version) - 4:01

A2. "Killer Queen" - 2:59

B1. "Who Wants To Live Forever" (Album Version) - 5:15

B2. "Forever" - 3:20

Personnel
Queen
Freddie Mercury – lead and backing vocals
Brian May – lead and backing vocals, synthesiser, electric guitar, orchestral arrangements
Roger Taylor – drums, drum machine, backing vocals
Additional musicians
Michael Kamen – orchestral arrangements, conductor
National Philharmonic Orchestra – strings, brass and percussion

Charts

Weekly charts

Year-end charts

Sales and certifications

Legacy

Tributes
 Seal performed a live version of this song at The Freddie Mercury Tribute Concert held at Wembley Stadium in April 1992 five months after Mercury's death. He said the song made him cry when he first heard it. Thomas Curtis-Horsfall of Smooth Radio stated Seal's performance of the song was "one of the standout moments" from the concert, adding "his spine-tingling rendition of the Queen classic had everyone in the arena close to tears."
 The song serves as the opening track for Diana, Princess of Wales: Tribute, a double CD released on 2 December 1997 in memory of Princess Diana three months after her death.
 Closing the Isle of Wight Festival in England on 12 June 2016, Queen + Adam Lambert performed the song as a tribute to the victims of the mass shooting at a gay nightclub in Orlando, Florida earlier that day.
 The song serves as the closing track of Episode 3 of Russell T Davies' AIDS drama It's a Sin (set in 1986).
 The animated television series Rick and Morty uses the song during the post-credits scene for the Season 5 episode "Mortyplicity".

Funeral music
In a 2005 poll conducted by digital television station Music Choice on what song Britons would most like played at their funeral, the song was voted the fifth most popular.

Dune version

German band Dune released their cover of "Who Wants to Live Forever", from their album, Forever, as a single in October 1996. It is sung by German singer Verena von Strenge and sold more than 500,000 copies in Germany alone, after reaching number 2 there. The single also peaked at number 3 in Austria, number 8 in Hungary, number 9 in Switzerland, number 12 in the Netherlands and number 59 in Sweden. On the Eurochart Hot 100, it reached number 13 in January 1997. "Who Wants to Live Forever" was nominated to the 1997 Echo Awards for the most successful national dance single.

Music video
The music video for "Who Wants to Live Forever" was directed by Matt Broadley. It was shot in the Scottish Highlands. The video begins on an old churchyard, where Oliver Froning plays a man who stands by a grave. He sees von Strenge appearing in ghost-like form, dressed in a white dress, singing to him. When Froning leaves the churchyard, he walks into the highlands. By a river, he stops for drinking some water, and again sees von Strenge standing in front of a waterfall, singing to him. In the end, he reaches the top of the mountains, where he is united with von Strenge.

Track listing
Who Wants to Live Forever (Sixtysix Radio Mix) (3:54)
Who Wants to Live Forever (South Bound Mix) (3:58)
Highland Trilogy: One Day in Glencoe (4:49)
Highland Trilogy: Valley of Tears (4:58)
Highland Trilogy: In the Air, Part 2 (10:29)

Remixes
Released: 4 December 1996

Who Wants to Live Forever (Komakino Remix) (5:32)
Who Wants to Live Forever (Future Breeze Remix) (7:03)
In the Air, Part 1 (5:13)

Charts

Weekly charts

Year-end charts

Sarah Brightman version

Soprano Sarah Brightman released her cover of "Who Wants to Live Forever", from her album Timeless/Time to Say Goodbye, as a single in 1997 (See 1997 in music). The single peaked at No. 45 in the UK singles chart.

Track listing

CD single
"Who Wants to Live Forever" (Album version)
"Who Wants to Live Forever" (Xenomania club mix)

Maxi CD single
"Who Wants to Live Forever"
"A Question of Honour"
"Heaven Is Here"
"I Loved You"

12" vinyl
"Who Wants to Live Forever (Trouser Enthusiasts 'Cybernetic Odalisque' Mix)"
"Who Wants to Live Forever (Xenomania Club Mix)"
"Who Wants to Live Forever (Xenomania Dub Mix)"
"Who Wants to Live Forever (X-Citing Mix)

References

 
 §

External links
  A Kind of Magic [2008].
  with Seal [2009].
 

Queen (band) songs
1986 singles
1986 songs
Songs from Highlander (franchise)
1997 singles
Sarah Brightman songs
Dune (band) songs
Songs written by Brian May
Song recordings produced by Reinhold Mack
EMI Records singles
Hollywood Records singles
East West Records singles
Virgin Records singles
Music videos directed by Matt Broadley
Songs about death
Music videos directed by David Mallet (director)
1980s ballads